Sasha Feldman is an American actor. He was the main character, Gabe, in Confessions of a Teenage Jesus Jerk (2017). He had a role, as "Bliz", in Get Shorty (TV series) (2017). He was born in Baku, Azerbaijan, and came to the U.S. as a young child.

References

American male film actors
American male television actors
21st-century American male actors
Year of birth missing (living people)
Living people
Actors from Baku
Azerbaijani emigrants to the United States